Kevin Alan Holland (born November 5, 1992) is an American professional mixed martial artist. He currently competes in the welterweight division in the Ultimate Fighting Championship (UFC). A professional since 2015, Holland has also competed for Bellator MMA, King of the Cage and Legacy Fighting Alliance.

Background
Holland was born in Riverside, California and raised mostly by his grandparents in Rancho Cucamonga and Ontario. His mother has been in and out of jail, meanwhile his father has been incarcerated throughout Holland's life. Holland attended Los Osos High School and Chaffey College. Holland started martial arts training when he was 16 years old and was a fan of Georges St-Pierre. He fell in love with the UFC after watching UFC 100, the first time he had watched the UFC, when he was visiting his father in Philadelphia.

Mixed martial arts career

Early career 
After compiling an amateur record of 5–0, Holland started his professional MMA in 2015. He fought under various promotions such as Xtreme Knockout, Legacy Fighting Championship, King of the Cage, Bellator MMA, Legacy Fighting Alliance and amassed a record of 12–3 prior to his signing by UFC.

Dana White's Contender Series 
Holland appeared on Dana White's Contender Series 9. He faced Will Santiago and won the fight via unanimous decision on June 12, 2018. Even with the win, Holland was not offered a contract on show but he was brought in to face Thiago Santos at UFC 227.

Ultimate Fighting Championship

2018
Holland made his UFC debut on August 4, 2018, against Thiago Santos at UFC 227. He lost the fight via unanimous decision.
 
Holland’s next fight came on November 24, 2018, at UFC Fight Night: Blaydes vs. Ngannou 2 against John Phillips. He won the fight via a submission due to a rear-naked choke in round three.

2019
Holland faced Gerald Meerschaert on March 30, 2019, at UFC on ESPN 2. He won the fight via split decision.

Holland faced Alessio Di Chirico on June 22, 2019, at UFC Fight Night 154. He won the fight via unanimous decision.

Holland was expected to face promotional newcomer Antônio Arroyo on November 16, 2019, at UFC Fight Night: Błachowicz vs. Jacaré. However, in late September, promotion officials elected to remove Holland from the bout in favor of a matchup against Brendan Allen on October 18, 2019, at UFC on ESPN 6. He lost the fight via submission in round two.

2020
Holland was expected to face Jack Marshman on March 21, 2020, at UFC Fight Night: Woodley vs. Edwards. However, on April 9, Dana White, the president of UFC announced that this event was postponed. Instead, Holland faced Anthony Hernandez on May 16, 2020, at UFC on ESPN: Overeem vs. Harris. He won the bout via a first round technical knockout.

Holland was scheduled to face Daniel Rodriguez on May 30, 2020, at UFC Fight Night: Woodley vs. Burns. However, On May 26, Holland was forced to withdraw from his scheduled bout with Rodriguez due to an injury and was replaced by promotional newcomer Gabriel Green.

Holland was expected to face Trevin Giles on August 1, 2020, at UFC Fight Night: Brunson vs. Shahbazyan. However, Giles fainted just prior to his walkout and the fight was canceled.

Holland faced promotional newcomer Joaquin Buckley on August 8, 2020, at UFC Fight Night 174. He won the fight via technical knockout in round three. This win earned him the Performance of the Night award.

Holland faced Darren Stewart on September 19, 2020, at UFC Fight Night 178. He won the fight via split decision.

Holland was scheduled to face Makhmud Muradov, replacing injured Krzysztof Jotko, on October 31, 2020, at UFC Fight Night 181. In turn, Muradov was removed from the fight due to testing positive for COVID-19 and was replaced by promotional newcomer Charlie Ontiveros. Holland won the fight in the first round when Ontiveros verbally submitted after suffering a neck injury due to a slam. This win earned him Performance Fight of the Night award.

Holland was scheduled to face Jack Hermansson at UFC on ESPN 19 on December 5, replacing an injured Darren Till. However, on November 28, it was announced that Holland was pulled from the bout due to testing positive for COVID-19.

Holland faced Ronaldo Souza on December 12, 2020, at UFC 256. He won the fight via knockout in the first round. This fight tied the record for the most UFC wins in a calendar year (5). This fight earned him the Performance of the Night award.

2021
Holland faced Derek Brunson on March 20, 2021, at UFC on ESPN 21. He lost the fight via unanimous decision.

Holland faced Marvin Vettori, replacing an injured Darren Till, on April 10, 2021, at UFC on ABC 2. With his second main event in three weeks, Holland tied the record for shortest turnaround between two main events. Though he managed to hurt Vettori with punches a few times, Holland was dominated on the ground for the majority of the fight and lost by unanimous decision. Subsequently – with one fight left on his prevailing contract – Holland signed a new, multi-fight deal with the UFC.

Holland faced Kyle Daukaus on October 2, 2021, at UFC Fight Night 193. Early in the bout a clash of heads occurred, resulting in Holland briefly being knocked unconscious. Though he continued to fight, Holland would be submitted via rear-naked choke moments later. Referee Dan Miragliotta reviewed the footage via replay and it was deemed the head clash led to the sequence of events resulting in Daukaus' win. Therefore, the fight was declared a no contest after the accidental head clash.

A rematch with Daukaus was scheduled on November 13, 2021, at UFC Fight Night 197. However, Holland withdrew from the bout due to injury.

2022
Holland returned to the Welterweight division for the first time since October 2017 to face Alex Oliveira on March 5, 2022, at UFC 272. He won the fight via technical knockout in round two. This win earned him the Performance of the Night award.

Holland faced Tim Means on June 18, 2022, at UFC on ESPN 37. He won the fight via D'Arce choke submission in round two. This win earned him his fifth Performance of the Night award.

Holland was scheduled to face Daniel Rodriguez in a 180-pound catchweight bout on September 10, 2022, at UFC 279. However, due to Khamzat Chimaev missing weight for his scheduled welterweight main event bout against Nate Diaz by nearly 10 pounds, the UFC was forced to remove Chimaev from the main event and change the card around. Holland was then scheduled to face Khamzat Chimaev at a 180-pound catchweight bout in the co-headliner instead, and the bout was scheduled for five rounds. Holland lost the fight via D’Arce choke submission in the first round.

Holland fought Stephen Thompson on December 3, 2022, at UFC on ESPN 42. He lost the fight by technical knockout after his corner stopped the fight after the fourth round. This fight earned him the Fight of the Night award.  Holland suffered three broken metacarpals in his right hand during the fight which required surgery afterwards.

2023 

Holland is scheduled to face Santiago Ponzinibbio on Apr 8, 2023, at UFC 287.

Personal life
Holland married his wife Charlese in 2019.

In October 2021, Holland stopped an alleged carjacker in his neighbourhood. Per reports, Holland chased the man down, and subdued him until police arrived.

In March 2022, Holland said he and his training partner stopped a shooting at a Houston, Texas restaurant. The men heard a shot while at a restaurant and saw a man with a weapon who was being wrestled by a member of the public; after removing the gun from the shooter’s hand, Holland said he subdued the man by placing him in a rear naked choke.

In May 2022, Holland revealed that he had rescued a driver from an overturned tractor-trailer. Holland had watched the driver speed up and lose control while joining the freeway, sliding off the embankment and flipping over. Holland got out of his car and got the man out from the truck, which was leaking fluid that Holland feared was going to cause an explosion.

Championships and accomplishments

Mixed martial arts
Ultimate Fighting Championship 
 Fight of the Night (One time) 
 Performance of the Night (Five times) 
Tied for Most wins in a calendar year in UFC history (5)  
Most wins in a calendar year (5) in Middleweight division
Most bouts in a 12-month period in UFC history (7) 
Xtreme Knockout
XKO Welterweight Championship
XKO Middleweight Championship
One successful title defense
 BT Sport
 2020 Male fighter of the year.
 Cageside Press
 2020 Male Fighter of the Year.
 MMAjunkie.com
2020 December Knockout of the Month vs. Ronaldo Souza
2020 Breakout Fighter of the Year
2020 Male Fighter of the Year
2022 December Fight of the Month 
MMA Weekly
2020 Breakout Fighter of the Year
The Athletic
2020 Breakthrough Fighter of the Year
Sherdog
2020 Breakthrough Fighter of the Year

Amateur titles
 Premiere Combat Group
 PCG Welterweight Championship
 Belts of Honorious
 BOH Welterweight Championship

Mixed martial arts record

|-
|Loss
|align=center|23–9 (1)
|Stephen Thompson
|TKO (corner stoppage)
|UFC on ESPN: Thompson vs. Holland
|
|align=center|4
|align=center|5:00
|Orlando, Florida, United States
|
|-
|Loss
|align=center|23–8 (1)
|Khamzat Chimaev
|Submission (D'Arce choke)
|UFC 279
|
|align=center|1
|align=center|2:13
|Las Vegas, Nevada, United States
|
|-
|Win
|align=center|23–7 (1)
|Tim Means
|Submission (brabo choke)
|UFC on ESPN: Kattar vs. Emmett
|
|align=center|2
|align=center|1:28
|Austin, Texas, United States
|
|-
|Win
|align=center|22–7 (1)
|Alex Oliveira
|TKO (elbows)
|UFC 272
|
|align=center|2
|align=center|0:38
|Las Vegas, Nevada, United States
|
|-
| NC
|align=center|21–7 (1)
|Kyle Daukaus
|NC (accidental clash of heads)
|UFC Fight Night: Santos vs. Walker
|
|align=center|1
|align=center|3:43
|Las Vegas, Nevada, United States
|
|-
|Loss
|align=center|21–7
|Marvin Vettori
|Decision (unanimous)
|UFC on ABC: Vettori vs. Holland
|
|align=center|5
|align=center|5:00
|Las Vegas, Nevada, United States
|
|-
|Loss
|align=center|21–6
|Derek Brunson
|Decision (unanimous)
|UFC on ESPN: Brunson vs. Holland
|
|align=center|5
|align=center|5:00
|Las Vegas, Nevada, United States
|
|-
|Win
|align=center|21–5
|Ronaldo Souza
|KO (punches)
|UFC 256
|
|align=center|1
|align=center|1:45
|Las Vegas, Nevada, United States
| 
|-
|Win
|align=center|20–5
|Charlie Ontiveros
|TKO (submission to slam)
|UFC Fight Night: Hall vs. Silva
|
|align=center|1
|align=center|2:39
|Las Vegas, Nevada, United States
|
|-
|Win
|align=center|19–5
|Darren Stewart
|Decision (split)
|UFC Fight Night: Covington vs. Woodley
|
|align=center|3
|align=center|5:00
|Las Vegas, Nevada, United States
|
|-
|Win
|align=center|18–5
|Joaquin Buckley
|TKO (punch)
|UFC Fight Night: Lewis vs. Oleinik
|
|align=center|3
|align=center|0:32
|Las Vegas, Nevada, United States
|
|-
|Win
|align=center|17–5
|Anthony Hernandez
|TKO (knees and punches)
|UFC on ESPN: Overeem vs. Harris
|
|align=center|1
|align=center|0:39
|Jacksonville, Florida, United States
|
|-
|Loss
|align=center|16–5
|Brendan Allen
|Submission (rear-naked choke) 
|UFC on ESPN: Reyes vs. Weidman
|
|align=center|2
|align=center|3:38
|Boston, Massachusetts, United States
|
|-
|Win
|align=center|16–4
|Alessio Di Chirico
|Decision (unanimous)
|UFC Fight Night: Moicano vs. The Korean Zombie
|
|align=center|3
|align=center|5:00
|Greenville, South Carolina, United States
|
|-
|Win
|align=center|15–4
|Gerald Meerschaert
|Decision (split)
|UFC on ESPN: Barboza vs. Gaethje
|
|align=center|3
|align=center|5:00
|Philadelphia, Pennsylvania, United States
|
|-
|Win
|align=center|14–4
|John Phillips
|Submission (rear-naked choke)
|UFC Fight Night: Blaydes vs. Ngannou 2
|
|align=center|3
|align=center|4:05
|Beijing, China
|
|-
|Loss
|align=center|13–4
|Thiago Santos
|Decision (unanimous)
|UFC 227
|
|align=center|3
|align=center|5:00
|Los Angeles, California, United States
|
|-
|Win
|align=center|13–3
|Will Santiago Jr.
|Decision (unanimous)
|Dana White's Contender Series 9
|
|align=center|3
|align=center|5:00
|Las Vegas, Nevada, United States
|
|-
|Win
|align=center|12–3
|Teagan Dooley
|Submission (triangle choke)
|Bellator 195
|
|align=center|1
|align=center|2:59
|Thackerville, Oklahoma, United States
|
|-
|Win
|align=center|11–3
|Hayward Charles
|TKO (punches)
|Xtreme Knockout 39
|
|align=center|3
|align=center|3:34
|Dallas, Texas, United States
|
|-
|Win
|align=center|10–3
|Grady Hurley
|TKO (knee and punches)
|LFA 21
|
|align=center|1
|align=center|1:24
|Branson, Missouri, United States
|
|-
|Loss
|align=center|9–3
|Curtis Millender
|Decision (unanimous)
|LFA 13
|
|align=center|3
|align=center|5:00
|Burbank, California, United States
|
|-
|Win
|align=center|9–2
|David Gomez
|TKO
|KOTC: Supernova
|
|align=center|1
|align=center|3:34
|Ontario, California, United States
|
|-
|Win
|align=center|8–2
|Geoff Neal
|TKO (punches)
|Xtreme Knockout 34
|
|align=center|3
|align=center|3:50
|Dallas, Texas, United States
|
|-
|Win
|align=center|7–2
|Jose Alfredo Leija
|Submission
|Xtreme Knockout 33
|
|align=center|1
|align=center|4:03
|Dallas, Texas, United States
|
|-
|Win
|align=center|6–2
|Sam Liera
|Submission (guillotine choke)
|KOTC: Martial Law
|
|align=center|2
|align=center|4:23
||Ontario, California, United States
|
|-
|Win
|align=center|5–2
|Sam Liera
|TKO (punches)
|KOTC: Night of Champions
|
|align=center|2
|align=center|2:56
|Ontario, California, United States
|
|-
|Loss
|align=center|4–2
|Rafael Lovato Jr.
|Submission (rear-naked choke)
|Legacy Fighting Championship 46
|
|align=center|1
|align=center|1:24
|Allen, Texas, United States
|
|-
|Loss
|align=center|4–1
|Ramil Mustapaev
|Decision (unanimous)
|Key City Chaos 2
|
|align=center|3
|align=center|5:00
|Abilene, Texas, United States
|
|-
|Win
|align=center|4–0
|Victor Reyna
|Submission (guillotine choke)
|Xtreme Knockout 26
|
|align=center|1
|align=center|3:44
|Dallas, Texas, United States
|
|-
|Win
|align=center|3–0
|Aaron Reves
|Submission 
|Kickass Productions: Border Wars
|
|align=center|1
|align=center|0:22
|Laredo, Texas, United States
|
|-
|Win
|align=center|2–0
|Jason Perrotta
|TKO (punches)
|Genesis Combat Sports 3
|
|align=center|1
|align=center|1:36
|Lubbock, Texas, United States
|
|-
|Win
|align=center|1–0
|Marcos Ayub
|TKO (punches)
|Xtreme Knockout 25
|
|align=center|1
|align=center|1:54
|Arlington, Texas, United States
|
|-

Kickboxing record

|-  bgcolor="#CCFFCC"
| 2017-10-21|| Win||align=left| Bubba McDaniel || XKO 38  || Dallas, United States || KO (Spinning Back Elbow) || 1 || 1:29|| 2–1
|-  bgcolor="#CCFFCC"
| 2017-8-12|| Win||align=left| Matt Foster || XKO 37  || Dallas, United States || KO (Punches) || 1 || 3:00|| 1–1
|-  bgcolor="#FFBBBB"
| 2016-4-30|| Loss||align=left| William Florentino || XKO 30  || Dallas, United States || Decision (Split) || 1 || 3:00|| 0–1
|-
| colspan=9 | Legend:

Amateur mixed martial arts record

|-
|Win
|align=center| 5–0
|William Clark
|TKO (punches)
|Cowboys Extreme Cagefighting
|
|align=center|2
|align=center|1:14
|San Antonio, Texas, United States
|
|-
|Win
|align=center| 4–0
|Terrence Moore
|TKO (punches)
|Austin Championships
|
|align=center|2
|align=center|0:06
|Austin, Texas, United States
|
|-
|Win
|align=center| 3–0
|Natanael Chavez
|TKO (punches)
|Cowboys Extreme Cagefighting
|
|align=center|2
|align=center|2:08
| San Antonio, Texas, United States
|
|-
|Win
|align=center| 2–0
|Zack Reese
|Decision (unanimous)
|Cowboys Extreme Cagefighting
|
|align=center|3
|align=center|3:00
| San Antonio, Texas, United States
|
|-
|Win
|align=center| 1–0
|Richard Bailey
|Decision (unanimous)
|Premiere Combat Group
|
|align=center|3
|align=center|3:00
|San Antonio, Texas, United States
|
|-
|}

See also
List of current UFC fighters
List of male mixed martial artists

References

External links
  
 

1992 births
Middleweight mixed martial artists
Living people
American male mixed martial artists
American practitioners of Brazilian jiu-jitsu
American wushu practitioners
People awarded a black belt in Brazilian jiu-jitsu
Mixed martial artists utilizing wushu
Mixed martial artists utilizing Brazilian jiu-jitsu
Ultimate Fighting Championship male fighters
African-American mixed martial artists